Linda Bove Waterstreet (born November 30, 1945) is an American actress who performed as (a fictionalized version of) herself in the PBS children's series Sesame Street from 1971 to 2002. Bove was the first Deaf actress to be part of the program's recurring cast.

Early life and education
Bove was born deaf in Garfield, New Jersey, to two deaf parents. As a child, she attended St. Joseph School for the Deaf in The Bronx, New York and subsequently Marie Katzenbach School for the Deaf in Trenton, New Jersey, from which she graduated in 1963. She attended Gallaudet College, now Gallaudet University, studying library science. From there, she became interested in theatre. She participated in several theatrical productions at Gallaudet including The Threepenny Opera and poetic characterizations of the Spoon River Anthology. In her senior year, she studied in a Summer School Program at the National Theater for the Deaf.

In 1970, Bove married Ed Waterstreet, another Deaf actor. They met while working together with the National Theatre for the Deaf.

Bove is an active member of the Deaf arts community.

Career

Television
Bove appeared in an episode of Happy Days as Allison, Arthur Fonzarelli's deaf love interest. She also performed on the soap opera Search for Tomorrow.

With her role on Search for Tomorrow, Bove became one of the first deaf actresses to become a regular on a soap opera series.
She performed as a member of the National Theater of the Deaf, founded in 1967.

Many cast members of Sesame Street and Search for Tomorrow, as well as the crew of TV technicians, have learned sign language from her.

Sesame Street
Bove debuted on Sesame Street in 1971 as the deaf character of her namesake; she was the first deaf performer on the show. On Sesame Street, she has introduced millions of children to sign language and issues surrounding the deaf community. Her character owns a very playful dog, Barkley.

Initially, a part-time cast member, by the mid-late 1970s Bove became a full-fledged regular cast member and her character was in a romantic relationship with Bob.

Her role on Sesame Street lasted from 1971 to 2002, making it the longest-running role for a deaf person in television history. The role increased public awareness of deaf culture and made it known that being deaf was not shameful.

In addition to playing Linda, Bove appeared frequently in various sketches and silent film segments, where she was often paired up with Sonia Manzano (Maria). She often played a supporting role in Manzano's Charlie Chaplin silent film sketches (with occasional voiceovers), usually as a pretty woman, but did play a second Tramp if two were needed (e.g. the mirror sketch and the opening umbrellas sketch). Manzano and Bove worked in many other sketches together, both with and without dialogue, on-camera, or voiceover. In 2019, Bove returned to the series for its 50th-anniversary special, 17 years after her last appearance.

Deaf Theatre
In the 1970s, Bove and some of her colleagues started the Little Theatre of the Deaf to attract more deaf people, as well as children. This company gained national and international attention. It dealt with communication among deaf people and the importance of teaching sign language to deaf children.

In 1979, Bove and the NTD traveled on a 30,000 mile world tour. Their biggest success was in Japan, where their show was attended by the royal family and they were invited to come on a television show.

In 1991 Bove and Waterstreet founded the Deaf West Theater Company in Los Angeles, the first theater company based on deaf actors and actresses. In that company, she starred in George Bernard Shaw's Saint Joan, based on Joan of Arc. The plays the company performs are translated into sign language and adjusted accordingly in order to make sense. The company uses speech along with signs in order to help bridge the gap between the deaf and hearing worlds.

Bove was also involved in a number of other projects pertaining to the deaf community, several related to children. She had a brief role in The Land Before Time IV: when the characters, which were dinosaurs, would talk in the movie, she would have a pop-up box in the corner of the video and interpret what they were saying in sign language. She also made videos such as Sign Me a Story.

Bove has starred in several productions of the play Children of a Lesser God.

Filmography

Publications
In 1980, Sesame Street and the National Theatre of the Deaf collaborated on publishing a book, Sign Language Fun With Linda Bove

Recognition 
Bove received an award in 1974 from AMITA, an Italian-American women's organization, in recognition for her work on television.
1991 - received an honorary degree from Gallaudet University
1992 - Bernard Bragg Artistic Achievement Award
July 3, 2012 Bove was presented with the Media Advocacy Award in recognition of her "success in advancing the civil, human and linguistic rights of the American deaf and hard of hearing community through use of the media and social networking".

References

Further reading

External links

 http://deafness.about.com/cs/celebfeatures/a/frelichbove.htm
 http://www.bookrags.com/essay-2005/1/4/23912/63095

1945 births
Living people
American television actresses
American film actresses
American deaf actresses
People from Garfield, New Jersey
Actresses from New Jersey
American deaf people
Gallaudet University alumni
20th-century American actresses
21st-century American actresses